Shahini (also Romanized as Shāhīnī; also known as Shāhīnī-ye Soflá) is a village in Hasanabad Rural District, in the Central District of Eslamabad-e Gharb County, Kermanshah Province, Iran. At the 2006 census, its population was 400, in 88 families.

References 

Populated places in Eslamabad-e Gharb County